The Office of Science and Technology Policy (OSTP) is a department of the United States government, part of the Executive Office of the President (EOP), established by United States Congress on May 11, 1976, with a broad mandate to advise the President on the effects of science and technology on domestic and international affairs.

The director of this office is traditionally colloquially known as the Science Advisor to the President. A recent appointed director was mathematician and geneticist Eric Lander who was sworn in on June 2, 2021. Lander resigned February 18, 2022 following allegations of misconduct.

On February 16, 2022, the Biden administration announced that deputy director Alondra Nelson would serve as acting director and former NIH director Francis Collins would serve as acting science advisor. Both assumed positions on February 18, 2022. In October 2022, Arati Prabhakar became Director of the Office of Science and Technology Policy.

On August 25, 2022, OSTP issued guidance to make all federally funded research in the United States freely available without delay.

History

20th century 

President Richard M. Nixon eliminated the President's Science Advisory Committee after his second Science Advisor, Edward E. David Jr., resigned in 1973, rather than appointing a replacement. In 1975, the American Physical Society president Chien-Shiung Wu met with the new president Gerald Ford to reinstate a scientific body of advisors for the executive branch and the president, which President Ford concurred to do. The United States Congress then established the OSTP in 1976 with a broad mandate to advise the President and others within the Executive Office of the President on the effects of science and technology on domestic and international affairs. The 1976 Act also authorizes OSTP to lead inter-agency efforts to develop and to implement sound science and technology policies and budgets and to work with the private sector, state and local governments, the science and higher education communities, and other nations toward this end.

21st century 
Under President Donald Trump, OSTP's staff dropped from 135 to 45 people. The OSTP director position remained vacant for over two years, the longest vacancy for the position since the office's founding. Kelvin Droegemeier, an atmospheric scientist who previously served as the vice president of research at the University of Oklahoma, was nominated for the position on August 1, 2018 and confirmed by the Senate on January 2, 2019. 

Michael Kratsios was nominated by President Trump to be the fourth Chief Technology Officer of the United States and associate director of OSTP in March 2019 and was unanimously confirmed by the Senate on August 1, 2019. During Trump's tenure, Droegemeier also managed the National Science and Technology Council.

President Joe Biden named, and the Senate later unanimously confirmed, Eric Lander as head of the Office of Science and Technology Policy, which is a cabinet-level post. Lander resigned in February 2022 following reports that engaged in abusive conduct against both subordinates and other White House officials.

In 2022, The White House Office of Science and Technology Policy held a roundtable discussion with some of the nation’s leading scientists to discuss the need to combat the climate crisis and counter arguments for delaying climate action. It is the first time that the White House has recognized scientists who study the climate denial operation run by the fossil fuel industry.

On August 8th, 2022, President Joe Biden signed into law the CHIPS and Science Act which included a provision to create a blockchain and cryptocurrency specialist advisory position under the OSTP to be established and appointed by the Director.

Staff
Key positions vary among administrations and are not always published online. Current deputy directors are listed alphabetically by portfolio and do not indicate an order of rank.

Director for the Office of Science and Technology Policy: Arati Prabhakar
Deputy Assistant to the President and Principal Deputy Chief Technology Officer of the United States: Alexander Macgillivray
Deputy Assistant to the President and Deputy Director for Health Outcomes: Danielle Carnival
Deputy Director for Science and Society: [vacant]
Deputy Director for Climate and Environment: Jane Lubchenco
Deputy Director for National Security: Stephen Welby
Deputy Director for Energy: Sally Benson
Principal Deputy Director for Policy: Kei Koizumi
Chief of Staff: Asad Ramzanali

Directors

See also 
Title 32 of the Code of Federal Regulations
National Science and Technology Council
President's Council of Advisors on Science and Technology
Science Advisor to the President

References

External links 

Office of Science and Technology Policy in the Federal Register
The President's Office of Science and Technology Policy: Issues for Congress Congressional Research Service

Office of Science and Technology Policy
Executive Office of the President of the United States
1976 establishments in the United States